Pyrites is a hamlet in St. Lawrence County, New York, United States. Pyrites has a post office with ZIP code 13677. Pyrites is also home to the Pyrites Volunteer Fire Department.

References

Hamlets in St. Lawrence County, New York
Hamlets in New York (state)